Fernando Manuel Lopes Alves Bento (born 19 September 1960) is a former Macanese international footballer.

Career statistics

International

References

1960 births
Living people
Macau footballers
Macau international footballers
Portuguese footballers
Association football goalkeepers
Sertanense F.C. players
F.C. Lixa players
G.D. Lam Pak players
People from Abrantes
Sportspeople from Santarém District